The following article shows a list of caves in Malaysia:

Sabah
Agop Batu Tulug Caves
Batu Punggul Cave
Batu Timbang Cave
Baturong Cave
Gomantong Caves
Keningau Cave
Madai Cave
Punan Batu Cave
Sinobang Cave
Sipit Cave
Tapadong Cave

Sarawak
Biocyclone Cave
Black Rock Cave
Clearwater Cave
Cobra Cave
Cobweb Cave
Daud's Cave
Deception Cave
Deer Cave
Deliverance Cave
Disappointment Cave
Drunken Forest Cave
Fairy Cave
Green Cathedral Cave
Green Cave
Hornbill's Secret Cave
Lagang's Cave
Laing's Cave
Leopard Cave
Lori's Cave
Metric Cave
Niah Caves
Pepper Leaf Cave
Perseverance Cave
Racer Cave
Sakai's Cave
Sarawak Chamber
Snail Shell Cave
Snake Track Cave
Solo Pot
Stone Horse Cave
Tardis Cave
Thunder Cave
Tiger Cave
Turtle Cave
Ulat Cincin Cave
Viper's Pit
White Rock Cave
Wind Cave
 and more than 200 others not listed

Peninsular Malaysia
Kedah
Gua Gunung Keriang
Gua Kerbau
Caves of Baling
Gua Air
Gua Sireh
Gua Jepun
Gua Kelambu
Gua Tembus
Caves of Langkawi
Gua Langsir
Gua Kelawar
Gua Landak
Gua Buaya
Gua Dangli
Gua Cerita
Gua Pasir Dagang
Gua Pinang
Gua Tok Sabung
Kelantan
Caves of Dabong
Gua Ikan
Gua Keris
Caves of Gua Musang
Gua Musang (namesake)
Gua Chiku 2
Gua Madu
Gua Cha
Gunung Reng
Pahang
Gua Charas
Gunung Senyum
Kenong Rimba Park
Kota Gelanggi
Caves of Merapoh
Gua Hari Malaysia (also known as Gua Padang Kawad)
Gua Air Mata Dayang
Gua Seribu Cerita
Gua Jinjang Pelamin
Gua Tahi Bintang
Perak
Caves of Kinta Valley (see also Kinta Valley National Geopark)
Gua Kandu
Gua Air
Gua Angin
Gua Kanthan
Gua Tempurung
Gua Tambun
Gua Datok
Ipoh cave temples
Caves of Lenggong
Gua Gunung Runtuh
Gua Tok Giring
Gua Teluk Kelawar
Gua Ngaum
Gua Badak
Gua Asar
Gua Kajang

Perlis
Gua Kelam
Gua Wang Burma
Gua Bintong
Selangor
Batu Caves
Art Gallery Cave
Dark Cave
Temple Cave
Terengganu
Caves at Kenyir Lake
Gua Bewah
Gua Taat
Negeri Sembilan

So far, Negeri Sembilan is the only known state to host two types of caves.
Gua Batu Maloi (talus)
Pasoh Caves (karstic)

See also
 Benarat 2005 Expedition
 List of caves
 Speleology

External links
The caves and karst of Malaysian Borneo
Benarat 2005 caving expedition
Batu caves
Caves of Gunung Benarat
Caves of Malaysia and Malaysian Cave Register
RGS Gunung Mulu expedition, Sarawak, 1977-78

 
Malaysia
Caves